Raymond Duncan (November 1, 1874, San Francisco, California – August 14, 1966, Cavalaire-sur-Mer, France) was an American dancer, artist, poet, craftsman, and philosopher, and brother of dancer Isadora Duncan.

Biography
Born in San Francisco on November 1, 1874, Duncan was the third of the four children of Joseph Charles Duncan (a banker) and of Mary Isadora Gray (the youngest daughter of Thomas Gray, a California state senator). Their other children were Elizabeth, Augustin, and Isadora, a noted dancer. In 1891, at the age of 17, Raymond Duncan developed a theory of movement which he called kinematics, "a remarkable synthesis of the movements of labor and of daily life."  He believed that the importance of labor lay in the development of the worker, not in production or in earnings.

In 1898 Duncan, his mother and his brother left America; they lived for a time in London, Berlin, Athens, and Paris. In 1900 he met the German poet Gusto Graeser in Paris and was deeply impressed by his ideas of natural and simple life. Duncan's theory of movement led him to work particularly closely with his sister Isadora (1877-1927), a noted dancer.  Duncan became particularly fond of Greece; he and his Greek wife, Penelope Sikelianos, sister of renowned Greek poet Angelos Sikelianos, lived in a villa outside Athens which was furnished in a historically accurate manner, with many of the furnishings handmade by Raymond, whose craftwork included ceramics, weaving, and carpentry.  No one was permitted to enter the villa in modern dress, and the family themselves dressed in classical Greek attire both at home and abroad (which caused some consternation in 1907 Berlin).

In 1909 Raymond and Penelope returned to the United States for a series of performances of classical Greek plays; they toured Philadelphia, Chicago, Kansas City, San Francisco, Portland, and other cities.  The couple also gave lectures and classes on folk music, weaving, dancing, and Greek music.  They then spent several months in the Pacific Northwest with the Klamath Indians.  While they were visiting New  York in early 1910, the New York City police took their son Menalkas Duncan to the Children's Society when he was found on the street wearing classical attire.

In 1911 Duncan and Penelope returned to Paris. At 31 Rue de Seine they founded a school, the Akademia, which offered free courses in their specialty areas of dance, arts, and crafts; they later opened a similar school in London. Each school, based on the idea of the Platonic Academy, was "an open house for every new effort in theatre, literature, music and art".  Duncan's ultimate goal was  a "complete technique of living" which, by synthesizing work, the arts, and physical movement, would result in the further development of man.

Duncan also wrote poetry and plays, newspaper articles, and editorials expounding his philosophy of "actionalism".

He printed his books on his own printing press using a typeface that he designed himself; the works included La Parole est dans le désert (1920), Poemes de parole torrentielle (1927), L'Amour à Paris (1932), and Etincelles de mon enclume (1957). Duncan's work on his printing press featured in an interview at the academy for a 1955 documentary by Orson Welles, Around the World with Orson Welles: St.-Germain-des-Prés.

At the age of 73 Duncan proposed creating the city of "New Paris York" at latitude 45N, longitude 36W (in the middle of the Atlantic Ocean) as a symbol of cooperation and inter-cultural communication.

See also

 American philosophy
 List of American philosophers

Notes

External links
 Raymond Duncan Collection at Syracuse University

1874 births
1966 deaths
20th-century American male writers
20th-century American non-fiction writers
20th-century American philosophers
20th-century American poets
American educational theorists
American male dancers
American male non-fiction writers
American male poets
Aristotelian philosophers
Artists from San Francisco
Writers from San Francisco